Diadegma crassulum is a wasp first described by Walley in 1967.
No subspecies are listed.

References 

crassulum
Insects described in 1967